St Mary's Church is in the village of Eccleston, Cheshire, England, on the estate of the Duke of Westminster south of Chester.  The church is recorded in the National Heritage List for England as a designated Grade I listed building.  It is an active Anglican parish church in the diocese of Chester, the archdeaconry of Chester and the deanery of Chester.  Its benefice is combined with that of St Mary, Pulford. The Dukes of Westminster are buried in the adjacent Old Churchyard.

History
St Mary's Church as it appears today is a red sandstone building which dates from the 19th century. It was built between 1897 and 1899 to a design by G. F. Bodley for the 1st Duke of Westminster at a cost of £40,000 (£ today). The new church was consecrated on Ascension Day  1900.

The present building is the third parish church to have been built in Eccleston. A church was certainly in existence in Eccleston in 1188, and in the late 18th century a print was made of a dilapidated medieval church which dates back to the 14th century. The medieval church was entirely replaced in 1809 by one of similar size, built on the site by William Porden for the Earls Grosvenor. A chancel was added in 1853, but by the end of the 19th century the 1st Duke of Westminster decided to replace Porden's church with an entirely new structure. After the new  church had been completed, Porden's church was demolished, although the south wall of its nave was retained as a "picturesque feature" and remains in the Old Churchyard.

Architecture

Exterior
The church is built in red ashlar sandstone.  Its plan consists of a west tower, a continuous six-bay nave, a chancel with a clerestory, north and south aisles, and north and south porches.  A long vestry block projects to the north.  The tower has long bell-openings, irregular buttresses and an embattled top.  Canopied niches above the south door contain statues.  The church is considered to be an example of Bodley's mature style anticipating features of Liverpool Cathedral.

Interior
St Mary's has a nave with north and south aisles and a South porch. Under the tower in the West is the baptistery with a font.

North aisle and chapel
The east end of the north aisle houses the organ loft and the vestry. There is also a large brass plaque listing those members of the Grosvenor family who were buried in the vault once part of Porden's old church. Their resting place in the northeast part of the Old Churchyard is now marked with a simple memorial and surrounded by a low wall with crosses in the corners.

The organ was built in 1899 by Gray & Davison.  It was modified around 1910 by Henry Poyser and further modified in 1984.

South aisle and Grosvenor Chapel
The east end of the south aisle, next to the church's chancel, is occupied by the Grosvenor Chapel. Above its altar are the carved figures of Jesus, Saint Augustine and Saint Paulinus.

Separating the Grosvenor Chapel from the church's chancel is a monument to the memory of the 1st Duke of Westminster dated 1901, which consists of a tomb-chest and canopy designed by Bodley with an effigy by Farmer and Brindley, sculpted by Léon-Joseph Chavalliaud.  Opposite, on the Grosvenor Chapel's south wall, is a bronze bust to the 2nd Duke as well as a memorials to Captain Lord Hugh William Grosvenor, who was killed in the First World War, the 3rd, 4th and 5th Dukes of Westminster.  The Grosvenor Chapel has two accesses: a door to the churchyard and a grille leading into the south aisle.

Tower and baptistry
In the tower there is a ring of eight bells which were cast by John Taylor & Co in 1899.

Under the tower is the baptistry with a font. The font is made from Thessaly marble, and has a lifting oak cover decorated with the carvings of eight saints.

In the baptistry is part of a memorial to the Grosvenor family dated 1624 that has been moved from the old church.

Other features
The authors of the Buildings of England series were impressed by the furnishings of the church, in particular the reredoses by Farmer and Brindley, the chancel screens, the organ case and the bench ends.  All the stained glass is by Burlison and Grylls.

Precincts

St Mary's Church is accessed from Church Road through a set of wrought-iron gates bearing the Duke of Westminster's coat of arms. These gates date from the early 18th century and were originally at Emral Hall, Flintshire. They were made by the Davies Bros. An avenue of lime trees leads from these gates to the south entrance of the church. Most of the enclosure around St Mary's Church is covered by lawns, although the section immediately east of the church and north of the Rectory is used as parish cemetery.

The walls and gates between Old Church Lane  and the Old Churchyard are Grade II listed.

Old Churchyard

Description

With its many tall trees, the Old Churchyard has features of a woodland. It is designated as a Grade II listed building.

Along the south side of the remaining wall of Porden's old church are the graves of the Dukes of Westminster, other members of the Grosvenor family and their relatives. A square enclosure in the northeast part of the Old Churchyard, now covered with gravel and surrounded by a low wall with crosses in the corners, marks the spot where the Grosvenor family vault was located within Porden's church. The names of those ancestors of the Dukes of Westminster who are interred here are recorded on a brass plaque inside the present church building. The grave of Edward George Hugh, Earl Grosvenor (1904–1909), by Detmar Blow and Fernand Billerey, sculpted by Emile Madeline, is a Grade II listed building.

The churchyard contains ten CWGC registered war graves. Of these, seven are from World War I and three from World War II. There is also the grave of a Victoria Cross recipient, Alfred Ernest Ind.

Burials and monuments

Westminster plot along old wall
 The Rev. John Gibbons-Longueville, rector of Eccleston 1854 to 1880, and his wife 
 Beatrice Charlotte Elizabeth (née Vesey, died 1876), daughter of 3rd Viscount de Vesci, wife of Lord Richard Grosvenor, brother of the 1st Duke of Westminster 
 Constance Gertrude (née Leveson-Gower, 1834–1880), daughter of the 2nd Duke of Sutherland, wife of the  1st Duke of Westminster 
 Lord Robert Edward Grosvenor (1869–1888), son of the 1st Duke of Westminster 
 Dora Mina (née Erskine-Wemyss, 1856–1894), wife of Lord Henry George Grosvenor (1861–1914) and mother of the 3rd Duke of Westminster 
Hugh Grosvenor, 1st Duke of Westminster (1825–1899)  (ashes, cremated in Woking Crematorium)
 Lord Edward George Hugh Grosvenor (known as Earl Grosvenor, 1904–1909), only son of the 2nd Duke of Westminster 
 Richard Grosvenor, 1st Baron Stalbridge (1837–1912), brother of the 1st Duke of Westminster
 Lord Henry George Grosvenor (1861–1914), son of the 1st Duke and father of the 3rd Duke 
 Lord Arthur Hugh Grosvenor (1860–1929), son of the 1st Duke of Westminster 
 Lord Edward Arthur Grosvenor (1892–1929), son of the 1st Duke of Westminster 
 Lord Gerald Richard Grosvenor (1874–1940), son of the 1st Duke of Westminster 
 Katherine Caroline (née Cavendish, 1857–1941), daughter of the 2nd Baron Chesham, widow of the  1st Duke of Westminster 
 Hugh Frederick Grosvenor (1927–1947), son of Robert Arthur "Robin" Grosvenor 
 Robert Arthur "Robin" Grosvenor (1895–1953), son of Lord Arthur Hugh Grosvenor (1860–1929) 
Hugh Grosvenor, 2nd Duke of Westminster (1879–1953) 
 Lady Mary Cavendish Grosvenor (1883–1959), daughter of the 1st Duke of Westminster. She married firstly Henry Crichton, Viscount Crichton (1872–1914), and was the mother of 5th Earl Erne; and secondly, Colonel the Hon. Algernon Francis Stanley (1874–1962), a son of the 16th Earl of Derby 
William Grosvenor, 3rd Duke of Westminster (1894–1963) 
 Lady Dorothy Alice Margaret Grosvenor (1890–1966), daughter of Lord Henry George Grosvenor (1861–1914) 
Gerald Grosvenor, 4th Duke of Westminster (1907–1967) 
 Constance Edwina (née Cornwallis-West, 1876−1970), former wife of the 2nd Duke of Westminster 
 Doris May (née Wignall, 1902–1975), wife of Robert Arthur "Robin" Grosvenor 
Robert Grosvenor, 5th Duke of Westminster (1910–1979)  
 Sally (née Perry, 1909–1990), wife of the 4th Duke of Westminster 
Anne Winifred "Nancy" (née Sullivan, 1915–2003), widow of the 2nd Duke of Westminster 
 Gerald Grosvenor, 6th Duke of Westminster (1951–2016)

Site of old Grosvenor family vault 

Many ancestors of the Dukes of Westminster, including:
Sir Richard Grosvenor, 1st Baronet
Sir Thomas Grosvenor, 3rd Baronet
Richard Grosvenor, 1st Earl Grosvenor
Robert Grosvenor, 1st Marquess of Westminster
Richard Grosvenor, 2nd Marquess of Westminster

A stone tablet in the enclosure (see here) bears the arms of the Grosvenor baronets with the dates 1599 and 1894 and the inscription: "This stone marks the resting place of those members of the Grosvenor family who were buried in a vault under the old church which was demolished in 1900 and who were reinterred in this plot and their names are recorded on the memorial tablet in Eccleston church." As the inscription indicates, the names of those family members buried here are listed on a large brass wall plaque in the north aisle of the church (see here).

Elsewhere in the Old Churchyard
Alfred Ernest Ind, VC (1872–1916). He served as a Farrier Sergeant in the Boer War, later worked on the estate of the Duke of Westminster and died in 1916.
 Sir Philip Hay, KCVO (1918–1986), Private Secretary to the Duchess of Kent 
 Dame Margaret Katherine Hay, DCVO (née  Seymour, 1918–1975), Woman of the Bedchamber to Queen Elizabeth II, granddaughter of Hugh Grosvenor, 1st Duke of Westminster and wife of Sir Philip Hay
 Sir Henry Nelson Clowes, KCVO (1911–1993) and his wife Diana Katherine Kerr (1926–2010), daughter of Major Basil Kerr (1879–1957)
 Major Basil Kerr (1879–1957)

See also

Grade I listed buildings in Cheshire West and Chester
Grade I listed churches in Cheshire
Listed buildings in Eccleston, Cheshire

References

External links

Photographs by Craig Thornber

Eccleston, St Mary's Church
Eccleston, St Mary's Church
Churches completed in 1899
19th-century Church of England church buildings
Gothic Revival church buildings in England
Eccleston, St Mary's Church
Eccleston, St Mary's Church
Commonwealth War Graves Commission cemeteries in England
Burial sites of the Grosvenor family
George Frederick Bodley church buildings